The Roman Catholic Diocese of Miracema do Tocantins is a diocese located in the city of Miracema do Tocantins in the Ecclesiastical province of Palmas in Brazil.

History
 October 11, 1966: Established as Territorial Prelature of Miracema do Norte from the Diocese of Porto Nacional
 August 4, 1981: Promoted as Diocese of Miracema do Norte
 October 14, 1989: Renamed as Diocese of Miracema do Tocantins
 July 10, 2019: Territory modified along with neighbouring Roman Catholic Diocese of Cristalândia
 January 31, 2023: Lost territories to establish the Roman Catholic Diocese of Araguaína

Statistics 
As per 10 July 2019, in time of modification, it pastorally served 153,760 Catholics (68.5% of 224,620 total) on 47,816 km² in 22 parishes with 21 priests (19 diocesan, 2 religious), 10 deacons, 31 lay religious (4 brothers, 27 sisters) and 7 seminarians.

Leadership

Ordinaries, in reverse chronological order
 Bishops of Miracema do Tocantins (Roman rite), below
 Bishop Philip Dickmans (2008.05.21 – present)
 Bishop João José Burke, O.F.M. (1996.02.14 – 2006.03.14)
 Bishop James Collins, C.Ss.R. (1989.10.04 – 1996.02.14)
 Bishop of Miracema do Norte (Roman Rite), below
 Bishop James Collins, C.Ss.R. (1981.09.17 – 1989.10.04)
Prelate of Miracema do Norte (Roman Rite), below
 Bishop James Collins, C.Ss.R. (1966.10.27 – 1981.09.17)

Coadjutor bishop
João José Burke, O.F.M. (1995-1996)

References

External links
 GCatholic.org
 Catholic Hierarchy

Roman Catholic dioceses in Brazil
Christian organizations established in 1966
Miracema do Tocantins, Roman Catholic Diocese of
Roman Catholic dioceses and prelatures established in the 20th century